No Mother to Guide Her is a 1923 American drama film directed by Charles Horan and written by Michael O'Connor. It is based on the 1905 play No Mother to Guide Her by Lillian Mortimer. The film stars Genevieve Tobin, John Webb Dillion, Lolita Robertson, Katherine Downer, Dolores Rousse and Frank Wunderlee. The film was released on October 14, 1923, by Fox Film Corporation.

Cast

Preservation
With no prints of No Mother to Guide Her located in any film archives, it is a lost film.

References

External links

Lantern slide at silenthollywood.com

1923 films
1920s English-language films
Silent American drama films
1923 drama films
Fox Film films
American silent feature films
American black-and-white films
1920s American films